Tendai Huchu (born September 28, 1982)  who also writes as T. L. Huchu is a Zimbabwean author, best known for his novels The Hairdresser of Harare (2010) and The Maestro, The Magistrate & The Mathematician (2014).

Tendai Huchu's first novel, The Hairdresser of Harare, was released in 2010 to critical acclaim, and has been translated into German, French, Italian and Spanish. His short fiction in multiple genres and nonfiction have appeared in Enkare Review, The Manchester Review, Ellery Queen's Mystery Magazine, Gutter, Interzone, AfroSF, Wasafiri, Warscapes, The Africa Report and elsewhere. In 2013 he received a Hawthornden Fellowship and a Sacatar Fellowship. He was shortlisted for the 2014 Caine Prize.

 he is a podiatrist in Edinburgh.

Publications 
 Our Lady of Mysterious Ailments, New York, Tor Books, 2022,  
 The Library of the Dead. New York, Tor Books, 2021
 The Maestro, The Magistrate & The Mathematician. Cardigan, AmaBooks, 2014
 The Hairdresser of Harare. Oxford, Weaver Press, 2010

References 

 

1982 births
Living people
Zimbabwean writers
21st-century novelists
Nommo Award winners